Club Sportivo Limpeño is a Paraguayan football club based in Limpio that currently plays in Primera División B.

History
Despite being founded in 1914, Sportivo Limpeño only joined the Paraguayan Football Association in 2013, being formerly affiliated to the UFI. The club had a successful debut, winning the Primera División C. After four seasons, the club was relegated back to Primera C, but achieved promotion by finishing as runners-up and will play again in the Primera B.

Women's team
Sportivo Limpeño has become more known because of its women's team, which participates in the Paraguayan women's championship since 2009. It finished as runners-up in 2014 and won the title in 2015 and 2016. The club also won the Copa Libertadores Femenina in 2016.

Since 2018 the club is in cooperation with Libertad and competing as Libertad/Limpeño.

Honours

Men's team
Primera División C
2013

Women's team
Copa Libertadores Femenina
2016
Campeonato Paraguayo
2015, 2016

References

External links
Sportivo Limpeño page on Facebook

Sportivo Limpeno
Sportivo Limpeno
Association football clubs established in 1914
1914 establishments in Paraguay